Charmingly Awkward is the first studio album by the rock band Street To Nowhere. It was independently released in 2005, and officially released in 2006 through Capitol Records.

Track listing
"Screamin" - 3:12
"Boxcars Boxcars Boxcars"  – 4:30
"Georgia, Can You Hear Me?"  – 5:04
"Miss Rolling Eyes" - 4:49
"Waste My Life For You" - 2:23
"Dead Cliché" - 3:17
"Tipsy"  – 4:49
"The Sun" - 3:43
"They're Not Like Us"  – 3:10
"Leave the Cameras On" - 2:42
"You Can't Go To Sleep" - 5:59

Information
 Featured various members of Bay Area bands on the end of "Tipsy".
 Recorded in 10 different places, including apartments, basements, living rooms, and even a cabin.
 Dave celebrated three birthdays in the time it took from the first tracks to be laid down until the release.
 Recorded on a budget gathered from local shows and sales of t-shirts and demos.
 Dave Smallen created the cover art.

References

2005 debut albums